Dragon's Lair is a video game franchise.

Dragon's Lair may also refer to:

Associated with the 1983 laserdisc game
 Dragon's Lair (1983 video game), a laserdisc arcade  video game
 Dragon's Lair (TV series), a mid-1980s animated TV series
 Dragon's Lair (1990 video game), a 1990 NES platform game
 Dragon's Lair: The Legend, a 1991 Game Boy platform game
 Dragon's Lair II: Time Warp, a 1991 arcade sequel to the original 1983 Dragon's Lair
 Dragon's Lair III: The Curse of Mordread, a 1993 video game
 Dragon's Lair 3D: Return to the Lair, a 2002 adventure video game
 Dragon's Lair III, a 2004 video game
 Escape from Singe's Castle (sometimes incorrectly known as Dragon's Lair II), a 1987 video game

Other uses
 Dragon's Lair (novel), a 2003 book by Sharon Kay Penman
 Dragon's Lair, associated with the British TV series Dream Team
 The Dragon's Lair (novel), the third book in The Lost Journals of Ven Polypheme series by Elizabeth Haydon, 2009